Mickybo and Me is a 2004 Northern Irish comedy-drama film written and directed by Terry Loane and based on the stage play Mojo Mickybo by Owen McCafferty. The film was produced by Working Title Films and released by Universal Studios.

Plot
An eight and a nine-year-old boy living in Belfast during The Troubles, one Catholic, one Protestant, become friends. They are obsessed with the film Butch Cassidy and the Sundance Kid and dream of robbing banks and emigrating to Australia.

Although the boys are from completely different backgrounds, they bond quickly. After watching the film together, they take on the characters' personas. Later, believing that they will get blamed for an old man's death, they go 'on the run,' trying to escape to Australia.

Their journey towards the ferry (which they believe will carry them to Australia) is a series of misadventures, including a 'bank robbery', riding a horse/ponies, a fire in a stable, escape from a police car. Once re-apprehended by the police, they did discover they had crossed the Irish border.

Upon their return, one of the boy's fathers is killed in a sectarian-related shooting, driving a wedge between them. In the closing scene, 30 years later, Mickeybo opens a large envelope from Jonjo, which contains the toy sheriff's star and a photo of him with his family living in Australia

Cast
 John Joe McNeill as Michael "Mickybo" Boyle
 Niall Wright as John "Jonjo" Wright
 Julie Walters as Mickybo's ma
 Ciarán Hinds as Jonjo's da
 Adrian Dunbar as Mickybo's da
 Gina McKee as Jonjo's ma
 Brendan Caskey as "Gank"
 Charlie Clarke as "Fartface"
Michael McElhatton as the Mechanic

Release
 Irish Film Festival of New Zealand
 Edinburgh International Film Festival, 2004
Ireland: Nationwide Cinema Release April 2005

Awards

Wins
• Best Irish Film in Big Buzz Ireland Entertainment Awards 2005.
• Best Feature Film in the Boston Irish Film Festival 2005.
• Audience Award at the Schlingel International Children's Film Festival, Chemnitz, 2005.
• The CIFEJ Award for Best Film & Children's Jury Award for Best Film in the OULU International Film Festival 2005.
• Best Children's Film, Tiburon International Film Festival, USA, 2006.
• Grand Prix (International Jury) and Grand Prix (Children's Jury), Buster Film Festival, Copenhagen 2006.
• Best Director, Olympia International Youth Film Festival, 2006.
• Best Film, Olympia International Youth Film Festival, 2006.
• Audience Award - Best Film at the Titanic International Film Festival, Budapest 2007.
•  Best Costume Design, Irish Film and Television Awards 2005

Nominations
 Shortlisted for the Michael Powell Award for Best British Film, Edinburgh International Film Festival, 2004.
 Best Film, Irish Film and Television Awards 2005
 Best Screenplay for Film, Irish Film and Television Awards 2005
 Breakthrough Talent, Terry Loane, Irish Film and Television Awards 2005
 Best Production Design for Film, Irish Film and Television Awards 2005
 Best Film, Austin Texas Film Festival 2005

References

External links
 

2004 films
2004 comedy-drama films
British comedy-drama films
British films based on plays
Films set in 1970
Films set in Belfast
Northern Irish films
Irish comedy-drama films
StudioCanal films
Working Title Films films
Irish films based on plays
Films scored by Stephen Warbeck
2004 comedy films
2004 drama films
English-language Irish films
Films about The Troubles (Northern Ireland)
2000s English-language films
2000s British films